Pecteneremus pilatus is a moth in the family Autostichidae. It was described by László Anthony Gozmány in 1963. It is found in Iran.

References

Moths described in 1963
Pecteneremus